The Bandar Baru UDA Jamek Mosque  is a main mosque in Bandar Baru UDA in Johor Bahru, Johor, Malaysia.

See also
 Islam in Malaysia

References

Buildings and structures in Johor Bahru
Mosques in Johor